Albion Downs Station, often referred to as Albion Downs, is a pastoral lease that operates as a sheep station.

History 
The property had been established prior to 1928 when it was owned by Mr. Howard. Sheep had been introduced to the property and increased in numbers as the country was being opened up. The quality of wool produced at the property was highly regarded, with top prices being paid for bales from Albion.

In 1976, the property was being run by Glenda and John Howard. It had suffered through a five-year drought and the flock had been reduced from 20,000 to 9,000 sheep. Dingos were also a problem and regularly had to be shot to protect the stock.

See also
List of ranches and stations

References

Mid West (Western Australia)
Pastoral leases in Western Australia
Stations (Australian agriculture)